Gazi Aziz Ferdous (died 2005) was a Bangladesh Nationalist Party politician and the former Member of Parliament from Jhalokati-2.

Career
Ferdous was elected to parliament from Jhalokati-2 in 1991 and 1996 as a Bangladesh Nationalist Party candidate. He had also served as the Jhalokati Sadar Upazila Chairman.

Death
Ferdous died on 13 December 2005 in Dhaka, Bangladesh.

References

2005 deaths
People from Jhalokati district
Bangladesh Nationalist Party politicians
5th Jatiya Sangsad members
6th Jatiya Sangsad members
20th-century Bengalis